Aloor is a village and panchayat in Ranga Reddy district, Telangana, India. It falls under Chevella mandal.
Aloor has a population of 15000. It is not less than a mandal. It is situated 11 km away from Chevella. The nearest city to Aloor is Vikarabad, which is about 18 km away. 
Aloor has many temples, a mosque, and a church. It is famous for its shops and heritage. The village has very good water deposits. It is well connected through roadways to Chevella and Vikarabad.

References

Villages in Ranga Reddy district